Kujakowice Górne  is a village in the administrative district of Gmina Kluczbork, within Kluczbork County, Opole Voivodeship, in south-western Poland.

The village is first mentioned in written records in 1253.

References

Villages in Kluczbork County